Sub silentio is a legal Latin term meaning "under silence" or "in silence".  It is often used as a reference to something that is implied but not expressly stated. Commonly, the term is used when a court overrules the holding of a case without specifically stating that it is doing so.

References

Latin legal terminology